Pleasure Principle may refer to:

 Pleasure principle (psychology), a psychoanalytical term coined by Sigmund Freud
 Pleasure Principle (fashion), a New York-based fashion label designed by Diva Pittala and Adrian Cowen
 Pleasure Principle (album), a 1978 album by Parlet
The Pleasure Principle, a 1986 album by Treat
The Pleasure Principle (album), a 1979 album by Gary Numan
 "The Pleasure Principle" (song), a 1987 single by Janet Jackson
 The Pleasure Principle (film), a 1991 film starring Peter Firth
 The Pleasure Principle (TV series), a 2019 TV-series, co-produced by Poland, Czechia and Ukraine (Zasada przyjemności, Princip slasti, Принцип насолоди)
 "Pleasure Principle", a song from Jean Michel Jarre's 2003 album Geometry of Love
 "Pleasure Principle", the final part of the song Impossible Soul by Sufjan Stevens from the album The Age of Adz
 The Pleasure Principle (Le Principe du Plaisir), a painting by René Magritte